The 2016 Abu Dhabi Grand Prix (officially known as the 2016 Formula 1 Etihad Airways Abu Dhabi Grand Prix) was a Formula One motor race held on 27 November 2016 at the Yas Marina Circuit in Abu Dhabi, United Arab Emirates. The race was the twenty-first and final round of the 2016 FIA Formula One World Championship and determined the 2016 World Drivers' Championship. It marked the eighth running of the Abu Dhabi Grand Prix and the eighth time that the race had been run as a World Championship event since the inaugural race in 2009.

The previous year's race winner Nico Rosberg entered the round with a twelve-point lead over his teammate Lewis Hamilton in the World Drivers' Championship. Their team, Mercedes, held a lead of two hundred and seventy-six points over Red Bull Racing in the World Constructors' Championship. Rosberg required a podium finish to secure the championship; Hamilton required a podium to remain in mathematical contention. Hamilton started the race from pole and went on to win the race, while Rosberg finished second, securing his maiden World Drivers' Championship title. Sebastian Vettel completed the podium in third.

A week after the Grand Prix, Rosberg announced his retirement from Formula One, making this Grand Prix his last. This was also the last Grand Prix for the Manor team, as the team folded before the start of the 2017 season, reducing the grid to 20 drivers. As well as being Rosberg's last Grand Prix, this would also prove to be the last Grand Prix for Esteban Gutiérrez and Felipe Nasr. This was expected to be the final Grand Prix for Jenson Button though he would later deputise for Fernando Alonso at the 2017 Monaco Grand Prix.

Report

Background 
Lewis Hamilton entered the final race of the season 12 points behind Nico Rosberg, therefore both came into the final race with a possibility of winning the world championship.

Hamilton would win if:

 He won and Rosberg finished fourth or lower.
 He came second and Rosberg finished eighth or lower.
 He came third and Rosberg finished ninth or lower.
 He came fourth and Rosberg finished eleventh or lower.

Rosberg would win if:

 He finished on the podium.
 He finished sixth or higher and Hamilton didn't win.
 He finished eighth or higher and Hamilton came third or lower.
 He finished ninth or lower and Hamilton failed to make the podium.
 Hamilton finished fifth or lower

Race
Lewis Hamilton held the lead from a cautious Nico Rosberg at the first corner of the race. Kimi Räikkönen gained third position from Daniel Ricciardo, with Vettel, Pérez, Hülkenberg, Alonso, Massa and Bottas completing the top ten positions at the end of the first lap. Max Verstappen spun and fell to 19th position after gently touching Nico Hülkenberg's Force India at the start. The RBR cars started the race on the more durable super soft tyres unlike the other top 10 cars who all started on ultra softs. By the 5th lap of the race, Verstappen had recovered to 13th position and only 19 seconds behind the leader, Hamilton.

Kevin Magnussen, who had pitted in the first lap with a broken nose after a touch in the start, retired from the race on lap 5 with suspension damage. The Force India and Williams teammates were fighting hard for 6th and 9th positions, respectively with Alonso holding position between the two teams' drivers. Bottas was forced to retire on lap 6 with a suspension issue.

Mercedes and Ferrari brought their lead cars (Hamilton and Räikkönen) in for their first pitstop on lap 7, and their following cars (Rosberg and Vettel) in subsequent laps. Red Bull also chose to react by pitting Ricciardo at this time, fitting the yellow-walled Soft tyres as did all the other front running cars at this point. The Mercedes of Rosberg had a 1.6s gap to the Ferrari of Räikkönen and maintained his position to the Ferrari after the pit stop, but now finding the yet to pit Red Bull of Verstappen between himself and Hamilton leading the race.

In what was at the time expected to be his last Formula One race, Jenson Button was forced to retire with broken right front suspension on lap 12 from 8th position. Daniil Kvyat was the next retirement from the race with gearbox problems on lap 14, from 16th position.

Meanwhile, Rosberg was advised by the Mercedes pitwall to not take any risks with Verstappen, believing that he will pit soon allowing Rosberg to emerge back into clean air. However, RBR took advantage of this conservative approach from Mercedes and chose to run Verstappen as long as they could in the first stint in order to complete the race on a 1-stop strategy and holding up Rosberg in the process. The risk posed by Verstappen's strategy to Rosberg became apparent soon, with Räikkönen following Rosberg close by and Vettel fast approaching this group. Rosberg was urged to attack and pass Verstappen on track, which he managed to do on lap 20 and began to catch Hamilton, with Räikkönen having pitted by lap 25 to cover for Verstappen and Ricciardo, who both pitted on laps 22 and 24 respectively.

The Mercedes drivers pitted on laps 28 and 29 for their final stint on the soft tyres. Rosberg now had a safe gap of 4 seconds to Verstappen, with Ricciardo and Räikkönen further behind. However, now Vettel was leading the race and going longer than all of the front runners with a view to driving a short final stint on the faster red–walled super soft tyres, while all other drivers were on the slower and older soft tyres. With Vettel yet to stop for the last time, Mercedes had concerns about the slow pace of Hamilton who was lapping as fast as Vettel who driving on much older tyres in the 1min46s, asking on lap 32: “Just wondering why you’re so slow? Currently unsafe to Vettel.” Hamilton immediately responded with a 1min45.3s, to which his race engineer replied that they were happy with this pace. Rosberg protested on lap 35 that this pace is too slow for a late race safety car. With 18 laps remaining, Vettel pitted to take the super soft tyres. He fell to 6th place, however his pace was alarming to Mercedes. At lap 41, Hamilton inquired the Mercedes pit wall about the pace of the cars around them. Vettel had lapped at 1min44.6s, and a 1-stopping Verstappen was much slower at 1min45.9s. Hamilton now began to slow the pace down much more dramatically, lapping in the 1min46s, in a bid to allow the chasing group to catch up to them while holding Rosberg around 1 second behind - the difficult to overtake layout of the track helping Hamilton not being overtaken himself. At this point individuals within the Mercedes pit wall, namely his race engineer and the team Executive Director Paddy Lowe began to issue repeated orders to Hamilton to increase his pace, but Hamilton continued to rebuff their requests.

Shortly after, as the leaders were lapping Carlos Sainz Jr and Jolyon Palmer, the Renault driver missed the braking point and rear-ended the STR of the Spaniard. Sainz Jr suffered problems due to this contact and retired from the race. Palmer was penalized with 5 seconds for the incident.

Vettel passed Räikkönen, Ricciardo and Verstappen and was less than a second behind Rosberg by lap 50. Hamilton's actions also allowed Verstappen who was 3.5 seconds away from Rosberg to be 1 second behind Vettel by this time.

In the penultimate lap, Vettel attacked Rosberg, who defended his position, with RBR also encouraging Verstappen to push up to Vettel's DRS to take advantage of a mistake by Vettel or Rosberg. Had Rosberg been passed by both Vettel and Verstappen, Hamilton would have won the World Championship Drivers' title and denied Rosberg his first title. Toto Wolff, the Mercedes Team Principal was able to see two sides to Hamilton's actions, while not condoning his insubordination, understood the racer's mentality in this situation. Others have supported him, going with the principle that "drivers are free to race".

Classification

Qualifying

Race

Notes
  – Jolyon Palmer received a 5-second penalty for causing a collision with Carlos Sainz Jr.

Final Championship standings 

Drivers' Championship standings

Constructors' Championship standings

See also 
 2016 Yas Marina GP2 Series round
 2016 Yas Marina GP3 Series round

References

External links

Abu Dhabi
Abu Dhabi Grand Prix
2016 in Emirati motorsport
Abu Dhabi Grand Prix